Streptomyces parvus is a bacterium species from the genus of Streptomyces which has been isolated from garden soil. Streptomyces parvus produces the actinomycin C complex, arylomycin A5, arylomycin A6 and actinomycin D.

See also 
 List of Streptomyces species

References

Further reading

External links
Type strain of Streptomyces parvus at BacDive -  the Bacterial Diversity Metadatabase	

parvus
Bacteria described in 1948